Mohammed Ghobadloo is an Iranian man facing a death sentence for his participation in the 2022 Mahsa Amini protests. He was charged with Moharebeh, which translates to "Waging War Against God," and was sentenced to death. He has been allegedly accused of running over Islamic Republic special units guards, killing one and injuring five of them. Ghobadloo and another prisoner sentenced to death, Mohammad Boroughani, have emerged as new faces of outrage in Iran against political executions of Mahsa Amini protestors. On January 9, 2023, hundreds of protesters gathered at the Rajayi-shahr Prison in Karaj when word circulated that Ghobadloo and Boroughani had been transferred to solitary confinement ahead of their scheduled execution. In this gathering, Ghobadloo's mother made a speech and she was embraced by the crowd who supported her. Boroughani's execution was halted on January 11, but Ghobadloo could still be executed at any time.

Background 
Thousands of protesters have been detained as a result of the Mahsa Amini protests, and dozens have been charged with offenses such as Moharebeh ("waging war against God") or Mofsed-e-filarz ("corruption on Earth"), which are punishable by death in the Islamic Republic of Iran. Iranian authorities executed four protestors, Mohsen Shekari, Majidreza Rahnavard, Mohammad Mehdi Karami, and Seyyed Mohammad Hosseini, for alleged crimes linked to the Mahsa Amini protests.

Trial and appeal 
On 29 October 2022, a court, under the headship of Abolqasem Salavati, was held. The court rejected the two lawyers of Ghobadloo and ordered a lawyer from the judicial system of the Islamic Republic’s counselling centre. His own attorney strongly objected to Ghobadloo’s proceeding in the trial. From the first day of his detention until court day, his attorney had no access to his case’s documents. There were no photos of the charge, no records of medical jurisprudence, and other common documents of accidents.

In court, Ghobadloo confessed to driving over the police guards intentionally and said he "would repeat this in similar situations." IR has deprived Ghobadloo of his medications, though he suffers from bipolar disorder, said his mother. Ghobadloo didn’t deny his disorder.

On 24 December 2022, the Islamic Regime's Supreme Court announced it had upheld the death sentence of Mohammad Ghobadloo after rejecting his appeal.

Responses
Ghobadloo's mother and lawyer are strongly opposed to the court's procedure. He has been sentenced to death on a vague charge of "enmity against god (Moharebeh)” and "corruption on the earth.”

Amir Raeisian, his attorney, has asserted that the accusations of running over IR's guards are too suspicious. Also, his mother has complained: “They have found my child helpless; they interrogated and trialled my boy with no lawyer and they sentenced him to death in his court’s first session.”

See also 

 Mahsa Amini protests
 Death sentences during the Mahsa Amini protests
 Mohammad Boroughani
 Execution of Mohsen Shekari
 Execution of Majidreza Rahnavard
 Execution of Mohammad Mehdi Karami
 Execution of Mohammad Hosseini

References 

Living people
Iranian prisoners and detainees
Human rights abuses in Iran
Year of birth missing (living people)